Siddharth Kannan is an Indian television and radio host, announcer, voice-over actor and a film critic.

Early life and background

He was born into a Tamil speaking family in New Delhi to parents V.Kannan and Radha Kannan, Sid K as he is popularly known as, moved to Kolkata with them and then spent 8 years in Lucknow and finally moved base with his family to Mumbai in 1994.

Career

Radio

At the age of 14, Siddharth joined Times FM as a Radio Host. He holds the record for becoming the youngest radio host in India.  In 1997, while at college, he joined Radio Star on 107.1 FM and hosted a show with Cyrus Broacha called ‘Miranda Char Baje Band Baje’. He started India’s first radio school called ‘Wild on Air’ in 1999. Emirates 2 FM in Dubai syndicated their Hindi shows to him, for whom he hosted and produced shows from Mumbai. He also produced and hosted shows for Rediff Radio on rediff.com. In 2009,He started an A list Bollywood  celebrity chat show ‘Meow Starburst’ on Meow 104.8fm. Later called as ‘Oye talkies’ and then re-christened as ‘Bollywood Khul Ke ‘ on Oye 104.8FM(a TV Today Network initiative). Sid K has interviewed Amitabh Bachchan, Shahrukh Khan, Salman Khan, Himesh Reshammiya, Aamir Khan, Ranbir Kapoor, Deepika Padukone, and Katrina Kaif.

Television 

He hosted his first TV show in 2006 –’Santa and Banta Newz Unlimited’ with renowned singer and rapper Baba Sehgal on Zoom. In 2010,Sid started his next TV show ‘See Taare Mastiii Mein’ –An ‘A list’ celebrity chat show on Mastiii.  In 2012,he was the commentator on ‘Ring Ka King’ on Colors produced by Endomol India and backed by Total NonStop Action Wrestling (TNA). In 2014,he was one of the hosts of Star Sports Pro Kabaddi and in the same year he was the host of the inaugural season of the Champions Tennis League on Sony Six.

On 10 May 2017, Siddharth Kannan was the official red carpet host of the Justin Bieber concert at DY Patil Stadium, Mumbai.

Voice Overs
He has been the voice over artist for the IIFA AWARDS (2000–2014), Filmfare Awards and Stardust Awards.

Personal life

Sid K’s parents are retired Corporate executives. His elder brother Hrishikesh Kannan, also known as Hrishi K,is a radio host and voice over artist in India.  Siddharth married Neha in 2014 in Chennai and Mumbai.

TV shows

Radio shows

Achievements

External links

References

Year of birth missing (living people)
Living people
People from New Delhi
Indian radio presenters
Indian film critics